Wishmaster 3: Beyond the Gates of Hell, known as Wishmaster 3: Devil Stone in the United Kingdom, is 2001 American fantasy horror film directed by Chris Angel and starring Jason Connery and A. J. Cook. It is the third installment of the Wishmaster series although John Novak replaces Andrew Divoff as the Djinn in the movie. It was the second direct-to-video sequel in the franchise and was filmed in Winnipeg, Manitoba, Canada.

Plot 
For the third time, the evil Wishmaster returns to wreck the lives of more innocents. This time, his victim is a beautiful, innocent and studious teenage girl named Diana Collins who accidentally opened up the Djinn's tomb (a strange box with a jewel inside) and released him. After gaining his freedom, the Djinn is asked by Professor Barash to let him be the one who makes the wishes. The professor wishes for two of the world's loveliest ladies to be in love with him.

However, as soon as the Djinn grants this wish, the women kill the professor; the Djinn takes the face off of the dead professor and is able to steal his identity. He then kills a secretary by her wishing for "files to burn up" but instead of the files, she burns. He takes the student file of Diana in an effort to find her and force her to fulfill her three wishes. While Diana is on the run, she must endeavor to prevent the Djinn from subjecting the entire world to Hell's wrath. She goes to a church for safety, but the Djinn is there instead of the priest. Her friend Ann, who is now the "professor's Teaching Assistant" makes the wish of "wanting to lose a little weight", to which she pukes up her guts in pain. Diana uses her first wish for her to stop having pain, but of course to the Djinn, that means killing Ann.

Diana, noting that she is in a St. Michael church, uses another wish to summon the archangel Michael who possesses the body de Oscar Merchan Valencia   (it was about to be her body, but Oscar Merchan Valencia pushed her away as the spirit went into him). A fight ensues with the Djinn actually somewhat winning, but Michael and Diana escape into a stage theater. As the Djinn tries to follow them, he goes a different way and encounters a female student named Elinor who puts the moves on him, and then wishes for him to "break her heart", which he literally does resulting in her death. Next, the Djinn goes into Diana's room where her friend Billy is. Billy is killed by telling the Djinn to "blow him"; he blows his body into a wooden head of a bull, and the horns pierce into his body. The Djinn then picks up a photo of Diana and her friends, and threatens to hurt Katie unless Diana makes her third wish. Michael has revealed to her that only by using his sword can she kill the Djinn. She isn't ready, and when he does try to give her the sword, it severely burns her arm, but Michael heals it.

Katie happens to find the dead body of Billy and finds herself being pursued by the Djinn into a science room, where the Djinn tricks her into thinking she could successfully hide from him. When she wishes "for a place to hide", he sticks her head into a cage of lab rats that bite at her head, resulting in her death.

A second battle ensues between Michael and the Djinn, resulting in the Djinn's hand briefly being cut off by the sword, but it grows back. Michael escapes with Diana in a car, but the Djinn runs to the car, jumps on top of it, and tries to hurt them. Diana drives his side into another car, thus making him fall off. She then careens into an information post and the car is flipped, mimicking how her parents had died years earlier.

In the end, Diana's attempt to commit suicide by jumping off a building actually gives her the ability to wield Michael's sword, and she kills the Djinn with it, but is fatally injured when they both fall in the process. Michael heals her wounds before returning to Heaven, and Diana is finally able to admit she loves her boyfriend, who has returned to normal.

Cast 
 Jason Connery as Professor Joel Barash
 John Novak as the Djinn
 A. J. Cook as Diana Collins
 Kate Yacula as Young Diana Collins
 Tobias Mehler as Greg Jansen / St. Michael the Archangel
 Louisette Geiss as Katie York
 Aaron Smolinski as Billy Matthews
 Emmanuelle Vaugier as Elinor Smith
 Sarah Carter as Melissa Bell
 Daniella Evangelista as Anne
 Jennifer Pudavick as Jose Rodriguez

Reception
On Rotten Tomatoes the film has 4 reviews, all negative.

References

External links 

2001 films
Direct-to-video sequel films
2001 horror films
2001 fantasy films
Direct-to-video horror films
Films about angels
Films set in universities and colleges
American supernatural horror films
Genies in film
Artisan Entertainment films
Films about wish fulfillment
Wishmaster films
2000s English-language films
2000s American films